Ana Maria Severino de Almeida e Paiva is a full professor at the University of Lisbon. Her work is around artificial intelligence and robotics. She is an elected fellow of the European Association for Artificial Intelligence.

Education and career 
Paiva earned her PhD from Lancaster University. In 2013 she became a full Professor at the Department of Computer Science and Engineering at Instituto Superior Técnico within the University of Lisbon. She is also the coordinator of the human-robot interaction focused research group Group on Artificial Intelligence for People and Society (GAIPS).

From 2020 to 2021, Paiva was the Katherine Hampson Bessell Fellow at the Harvard Radcliffe Institute.

Selected publications

Awards and honors 
In 2018, Paiva received first place in the Blue Sky Ideas Conference Track at the AAAI Conference on Artificial Intelligence. Paiva was named a fellow for the European Association for Artificial Intelligence in 2019.

References

External links 

, April 9, 2018

Living people
Women computer scientists
Academic staff of the University of Lisbon
Alumni of Lancaster University
Fellows of the European Association for Artificial Intelligence
Year of birth missing (living people)